Pat Martin is an American photographer, based in Los Angeles. In 2019 he won the Taylor Wessing Photographic Portrait Prize for portraits of his mother.

Life and work
Martin grew up in Mar Vista near Venice Beach, West Los Angeles, California.

His mother struggled with addiction throughout Martin's life. Knowing that she did not have long to live, from 2016 to 2018 he used portraiture to reconnect with her before her death. That series, titled Goldie (Mother), was described by Sean O'Hagan in The Observer as "searingly honest portraits that, even without the narrative behind them, have an emotional heft rare in contemporary photography." Since 2016 Martin's photography has also been of other family members.

Awards
2019: First prize (£15,000), Taylor Wessing Photographic Portrait Prize, National Portrait Gallery, London for 2 photographs from Goldie (Mother)

Group exhibitions
Taylor Wessing Photographic Portrait Prize, National Portrait Gallery, London, 2019

References

External links

Photographers from California
21st-century American photographers
People from Los Angeles
Date of birth missing (living people)
Place of birth missing (living people)
Living people
Year of birth missing (living people)